Armen Vardapetyan (VAR) , jeweler, artist, sculptor. Armenian folk artist of applied art.

Biography
Born on 23 January 1980 in Yerevan, Armenia, Armen graduated from the N. Stepanyan Yerevan secondary school of № 71 in 1996. Since 1990, studied in Genrih Igityan National school of aesthetics, as a sculptor of small forms.

In 1996, due to his love for animals, Armen entered the Faculty of Veterinary Medicine at the Armenian Agricultural Academy. From 2001 -2004, he was a postgraduate student at the Armenian Agricultural Academy and defended PhD thesis. Since 2006 Armen works at the Yerevan State University.

Career 
Armen Vardapetyan lifelong was engaged in creative work: sculpture, painting, creation of jewellery, working with different materials. Since 2008, he studying jewelry art, exhibit, and sold his works under the creative nickname VAR (translated from the Armenian language – bright, colorful). In 2010 he was awarded "The Folk Artist of Armenia" title. A. Vardapetyan is a member of the Armenian Jewelers Association. Since 2015 member of Armenian Artists Union. VAR jewellery is available in art galleries of Armenia, Russia and Europe. Nowadays VAR is working on a jewelry collection in national style named "KILIKIA" after the ancient Armenian Kingdom.

Exhibitions 
 Slovak Design Week, Bratislava, 26–27.09.2009
 Vienna Design Week, Vienna, Schullin Gallery, 01-09.10.2009 
 "European Heritage Days" National Folk Museum, Yerevan, 18–19.09.2010
 Art Exhibition organized by Armenian Young Women's Association, Yerevan, Marriott Hotel, 6 April 2011
 EXPO Health and Beauty 2011, Yerevan, 
 ARMENIA EXPO 2011, Yerevan, 9-11.09.2011
 "20 Years of Armenia Independence" Artists' Union of Armenia, Yerevan, 15 September 2011
 Yerevan International Jewellery Show, Yerevan, 21–23.09.2011
 "Erebuni-Yerevan", Artists' Union of Armenia, Yerevan, 12 October 2011
 "20th Anniversary of Shushi Emancipation", Artists' Union of Armenia, Yerevan, 5 May 2012
 "80th Anniversary of Artists Union of Armenia", Artists' Union of Armenia, Yerevan, 30 October 2012
 Yerevan International Jewellery Show, Yerevan, 2014
 "Made in Armenia" EXPO. Meridian EXPO Center, Yerevan 26–28.05.2015
 First International ARvesT EXPO'15. Hay-Art Gallery, Yerevan, 19–29.05.2015

See also
List of Armenian artists
List of Armenians
Culture of Armenia

References

External links
 Official site
 Armenian Jewellery VAR
 ՎԱՌ (Վարդապետյան Արմեն) (1980)

1980 births
Armenian painters
Armenian sculptors
Living people
Artists from Yerevan